The Raftsund Bridge is a two-lane cantilever road bridge in Hadsel Municipality in Nordland county, Norway. The bridge carries the European route E10 highway and it crosses the Raftsundet strait between the islands of Austvågøya and Hinnøya. The bridge has 4 spans.

It was the last of the long bridges connecting the Vesterålen islands. It is part of the Lofast project, the road connecting the Lofoten islands to the mainland, which was completed in December 2007.

See also
List of bridges
List of bridges by length
List of bridges in Norway
List of bridges in Norway by length

References

External links
 
The new road to Lofoten (in Norwegian)
Home.no.net

Road bridges in Nordland
Bridges completed in 1998
1998 establishments in Norway
European route E10 in Norway
Hadsel
Roads within the Arctic Circle